The Perkins Estate is a historic estate at 450 Warren Street in Brookline, Massachusetts.  The property was part of the summer estate of the Cabot family, originally belonging to Thomas Handasyd Perkins; the present main mansion house was built in the 1850s to a plan by Edward Clarke Cabot for his sister-in-law, Elizabeth Perkins Cabot.  The grounds of the property were originally designed by Perkins, and subsequent generations maintained the grounds to a high degree.  In the 1980s it was owned by Mitch Kapor, founder of Lotus Software.

The property was listed on the National Register of Historic Places in 1985.

See also
National Register of Historic Places listings in Brookline, Massachusetts

References

Gothic Revival architecture in Massachusetts
Houses in Brookline, Massachusetts
National Register of Historic Places in Brookline, Massachusetts
Houses on the National Register of Historic Places in Norfolk County, Massachusetts